The Hanabanilla Dam is an embankment dam on the Hanabanilla River near the village of El Salto del Hanabanilla in Villa Clara Province, Cuba. The purpose of the dam is to provide water for irrigation and municipal uses and to generate hydroelectric power.

Overview
It is the largest hydroelectric power station in the country. Near the southern end of the reservoir is Jibacoa Dam, an auxiliary dam, which closes off one valley to create the existing large reservoir.

The dam was constructed between 1958 and 1961. The power station was commissioned in 1963. In March 2014 a rehabilitation of the power station began.

See also

Escambray Mountains
Manicaragua

References

External links

Dams in Cuba
Hydroelectric power stations in Cuba
Dams completed in 1961
Energy infrastructure completed in 1963
Buildings and structures in Villa Clara Province
1961 establishments in Cuba
20th-century architecture in Cuba